Alan Notholt Guerrero (born 21 May 1980) is a Mexican politician from the Ecologist Green Party of Mexico. From 2006 to 2009 he served as Deputy of the LX Legislature of the Mexican Congress representing the State of Mexico.

References

1980 births
Living people
Politicians from the State of Mexico
Ecologist Green Party of Mexico politicians
21st-century Mexican politicians
Deputies of the LX Legislature of Mexico
Members of the Chamber of Deputies (Mexico) for the State of Mexico